Giuseppe Giofrè (born January 10, 1993) is an Italian dancer, model, and choreographer based in Los Angeles. He gained popularity after being a student at Amici di Maria De Filippi show, and for being on tour as a dancer for Ariana Grande, Jennifer Lopez, Nick Jonas, Taylor Swift and Nicki Minaj.

Early life 
Giofrè was born and raised in Gioia Tauro, Calabria. He started studying dance as a child in his hometown and at seventeen he moved to Reggio Calabria, Italy to study hip hop/jazz-funk music.

Career 
In the summer of 2011 he joined the Italian talent show Amici di Maria De Filippi, winning in the dance category. The prize was a scholarship to study at The Millennium Dance Complex in Los Angeles. After completing his studies, in July 2012 he took part in the music video of the song "Live 4 Die 4" by R.J. feat. Pitbull, released in September 2012. Giofrè later joined the dance corps of the UK series The X Factor, with choreography by Brian Friedman.

On April 1, 2013, Giofrè released his debut single, titled "Break". He later became a dancer for the NRJ Music Awards broadcast by the French television station TF1.

In 2014, he moved permanently to Los Angeles, thanks to a contract with McDonald Selzinick Associates (MSA).

In 2015, Giofrè joined American singer-songwriter Taylor Swift's The 1989 World Tour as a backup dancer. He reprised the role for Swift's Reputation Stadium Tour.

In 2018, Giofrè was one of the dancers for Britney Spears' Britney: Domination residency. From 2019, he was also a dancer for Jennifer Lopez on her Its My Party tour.

Giofrè has worked alongside international artists such as Dua Lipa Justin Timberlake, Camila Cabello, Jennifer Lopez, Kelly Clarkson, Ariana Grande, Nicki Minaj, Paula Abdul, Wiz Khalifa, Leona Lewis, Kelsea Ballerini, Nelly, Charli XCX, Ellie Goulding, Selena Gomez, Omi, Fifth Harmony, Mary J Blige, Little Mix, Jason Derulo, Fetty Wap, Nick Jonas, Chiquis, Dan Reynolds of Imagine Dragons, The Weeknd, Erika Jayne, Carrie Underwood, Redfoo, Pitbull and Ricky Martin.

Personal life 
Since 2018, he has been romantically linked to fellow dancer Adam Vesperman.

Discography

Singles

Filmography

Films

Television

Tours /live stage 
Dua Lipa Studio 2054
Livvia Jonas Brothers Happiness Begins Tour Opening 2019/2020
NYSE Annual Christmas Tree Lighting LIVVIA 2019
Jennifer Lopez It's My Party Tour 2019
Britney Spears Domination 2019
Taylor Swift Reputation Stadium Tour 2018
Taylor Swift BBC The Biggest Weekend 2018
Paula Abdul Mixtape Festival 2016
Taylor Swift 1989 World Tour 2015
Taylor Swift British Summer Hyde Park 2015
Taylor Swift Rock In Rio USA 2015

Music videos and commercials 
Dua Lipa for Vogue
Sam Smith feat Demi Lovato I'm Ready
Pink- Beautiful Trauma
Kelly Clarkson- Love So Soft
Redfoo- Juicy Wiggle
Erika Jayne- Crazy
Carrie Underwood- Something In The Water
Chiquis Rivera- La MalQuerida
Taylor Swift- New Romantics
Taylor Swift- Look What You Made Me Do
Taylor Swift- ...Ready For it?
Taylor Swift- ME!
Taylor Swift- You Need To Calm Down
L’Oreal Karlie Kloss
OLD NAVY The Holiyay Dancer
OLD NAVY Electric Holidays
OLD NAVY Jingle Jammies Jam
OLD NAVY Rockstar

References

External links 
Official website

1993 births
Living people
Italian dancers
Italian male dancers
21st-century Italian dancers
Hip hop dancers
People from Gioia Tauro